Mardraum – Beyond the Within is the fifth studio album by Norwegian heavy metal band Enslaved.

Track listing

Personnel 
 Enslaved

 Grutle Kjellson – bass guitar, electronics, vocals, arrangement, production, mixing
 Ivar Bjørnson – guitar, keyboards, synthesizers, percussion, arrangement, production, mixing
 Roy Kronheim – guitar, arrangement, production, mixing
 Dirge Rep (Per Husebø) – drums, percussion, arrangement, production, mixing

 Production

 Lars Szöke – recording, engineering
 Peter Tägtgren – recording, engineering, mixing

References 

Enslaved (band) albums
2000 albums
Season of Mist albums